Edgemoor is a census-designated place in New Castle County, Delaware, United States. The population was 5,677 at the 2010 census.

Geography
Edgemoor is located at  (39.7501139, -75.4996414).

History
Edgemoor was originally developed as a village by the Edgemoor Iron Company in 1871.

Demographics

As of the census of 2000, there were 5,992 people, 2,507 households, and 1,566 families living in the CDP. The racial makeup of the CDP was 62.27% White, 33.58% African American, 0.20% Native American, 1.15% Asian, 0.02% Pacific Islander, 0.98% from other races, and 1.80% from two or more races. Hispanic or Latino people of any race were 2.72% of the population.

There were 2,507 households, out of which 32.7% had children under the age of 18 living with them, 38.1% were married couples living together, 19.5% had a female householder with no husband present, and 37.5% were non-families. 31.8% of all households were made up of individuals, and 9.2% had someone living alone who was 65 years of age or older.  The average household size was 2.38 and the average family size was 3.02.

In the CDP, the population was spread out, with 28.2% under the age of 18, 6.9% from 18 to 24, 32.5% from 25 to 44, 21.5% from 45 to 64, and 10.9% who were 65 years of age or older.  The median age was 35 years. For every 100 females, there were 85.1 males.  For every 100 females age 18 and over, there were 79.3 males.

The median income for a household in the CDP was $39,931, and the median income for a family was $45,903. Males had a median income of $36,957 versus $29,675 for females. The per capita income for the CDP was $22,081.  About 13.4% of families and 15.0% of the population were below the poverty line, including 31.1% of those under age 18 and 1.2% of those age 65 or over.

Education
Edgemoor is in the Brandywine School District.

References

External links

Census-designated places in New Castle County, Delaware
Census-designated places in Delaware
Delaware populated places on the Delaware River